The following list includes settlements, geographic features, and political subdivisions of North Carolina whose names are derived from Native American languages.

Listings

Counties

 Alamance County
 Alleghany County
 Catawba County
 Catawba
 Catawba River
 South Fork Catawba River
 Cherokee County – named after the Cherokee people.
 Town of Cherokee
 Chowan County
 Currituck County
 Pamlico County
 Pasquotank County
 Pasquotank River
 Perquimans County
 Perquimans River
 Watauga County
 Watauga River
 Yadkin County
 Yadkinville
 Yadkin College
 Yadkin River
 South Yadkin River
 Little Yadkin River

Settlements

 Ahoskie
 Arapahoe
 Bogue
 Bolivia
 Burgaw
 Coinjock
 Cullowhee
 Etowah
 Hatteras
 Hatteras Inlet
 Hatteras Island
 Hiwassee
 Township of Hiawassee
 Hiwassee River
 Hiwassee Reservoir
 Hobucken
 Lake Toxaway
 Lake Toxaway
 Manteo
 Neuse Forest
 Neuse River
 Ocracoke
 Ocracoke Inlet
 Ocracoke Island
 Roanoke Island
 Roanoke River
 Roanoke Canal
 Sauratown Mountains
 Saxapahaw
 Swannanoa
 Wakulla
 Wanchese
 Waxhaw

Bodies of water

 Aycock Creek
 Aycock Swamp
 Calabash River
 Chattooga River
 Chatuge Lake
 Chatuge Dam
 Cheoah River
 Chinquapin Branch
 Little Chinquapin Branch
 Chocowinity
 Chocowinity Bay
 Chowan River
 Cohooque Creek
 Contentnea Creek
 Little Contentnea Creek
 Cullasaja River
 Donoho Creek
 Eno River
 Great Coharie Creek
 Little Coharie Creek
 Hyco River
 Hyco Creek
 South Hyco Creek
 Hyco Lake
 Lake Mattamuskeet
 Lake Santeetlah
 Lake Tahoma
 Lake Waccamaw
 Little Tennessee River
 Meherrin River
 Moccasin Creek
 Moccasin Creek (Contentnea Creek tributary)
 Mocassin Run
 Nahunta Swamp
 Nantahala Lake
 Nantahala River
 Nantahala National Forest
 Southern Nantahala Wilderness
 Nolichucky River
 Nottely River
 North Pacolet River
 Nottoway River
 Oconaluftee River
 Pamlico River
 Pamlico Sound
 Pocoson Branch
 Pocoson Branch (Trent River tributary)
 Possum Swamp
 Possumquarter Creek
 Potecasi Creek
 Raccoon Branch
 West Prong Raccoon Creek
 Saponi Creek
 Sapony Creek
 Little Sapony Creek
 Scuppernong River
 Seneca Branch
 Shaddox Creek
 Little Shaddox Creek
 Shocco Creek
 Little Shocco Creek
 Swannanoa River
 Tallulah River
 Tellico River
 Tuckahoe Creek
 Tuckasegee River
 Uwharrie River
 Little Uwharrie River
 Waccamaw River
 Wiccacon River

Other
 Bogue Banks

See also
 List of place names of Native American origin in the United States

References

Citations

Sources
 Bright, William (2004). Native American Place Names of the United States. Norman: University of Oklahoma Press.
 Campbell, Lyle (1997). American Indian Languages: The Historical Linguistics of Native America. Oxford: Oxford University Press.

 
North Carolina
 
North Carolina
North Carolina-related lists